Marcel-André Buffet (14 May 1922 – 20 August 2009) was a French sailor. He competed in the Flying Dutchman event at the 1964 Summer Olympics.

References

External links
 

1922 births
2009 deaths
French male sailors (sport)
Olympic sailors of France
Sailors at the 1964 Summer Olympics – Flying Dutchman
Sportspeople from Arras